Jean-Pierre Bade (born 18 March 1960 in Saint-Louis, Réunion) is a retired  French football player who played with RC Lens, Marseille, FC Nantes, RC Strasbourg, Racing Paris and Bordeaux.

After retitiring as a player, Bade has managed a number of clubs in Réunion, including SS Saint-Louisienne and JS Saint-Pierroise. He currently manages US Stade Tamponnaise.

External links

Profile

1960 births
Living people
People from Saint-Louis, Réunion
French footballers
Footballers from Réunion
RC Lens players
Olympique de Marseille players
FC Nantes players
RC Strasbourg Alsace players
Racing Club de France Football players
FC Girondins de Bordeaux players
Ligue 1 players
French football managers
Football managers from Réunion
JS Saint-Pierroise players
Réunion national football team managers
Association football defenders
SS Saint-Louisienne players
SS Saint-Louisienne managers